The 2008 Lahore bombings were twin suicide car bombings which killed at least 28 people and wounded more 350 people in Lahore, Pakistan on March 11 2008. The first bomb targeted the FIA building around 9.30am when employees were arriving for work and the second smaller blast targeted an advertising agency in a residential area. The injured also included around 40 schoolchildren after windows were smashed due to the force of the explosion. The blasts were the escalation of militant campaign against government targets.

References

External links
Al Jazeera footage of an attack

2008 murders in Pakistan
21st-century mass murder in Pakistan
2000s in Lahore
Lahore Bombings, 2008
Federal Investigation Agency
Terrorist incidents in Lahore
Terrorist incidents in Pakistan in 2008